UHL or Uhl may refer to:

The United Hockey League
The Ukrainian Hockey League
The Uhl River in the Himalayas
Uhl Pottery, American manufacturer of pottery
Uhl's Bay, Saskatchewan, Canada, a hamlet 
 Uhl, Kansas, United States, a settlement 
The Uhl anomaly, a rare disease of the heart 
The Norwegian Young Conservatives (Unge Høyres Landsforbund)
Unilateral hearing loss
University Hospital Lewisham, Lewisham, South East London, an NHS hospital
University Hospital Limerick, Ireland, a hospital 
 UHL, the National Rail station code for Upper Holloway railway station, London, England

People
Alfred Uhl, Austrian composer
Bernd Uhl (1946-2023), German Roman Catholic prelate
Bill Uhl, American basketball player
Billy Uhl, American motorcyclist
Bob Uhl, American baseball player
Eduard Uhl, mayor of Vienna
Edwin F. Uhl, American lawyer and politician
Edward Uhl, American soldier and inventor
Frida Uhl, Austrian writer and translator
Fritz Uhl, Austrian tenor
Hans-Peter Uhl, German politician
Lisa Uhl, American runner
Markus Uhl (born 1979), German politician
Michael Uhl, American activist
Miranda Uhl, American swimmer
Natalie Whitford Uhl (1919-2017), American Botanist
Nadja Uhl, German actress
German-language surnames
Czech-language surnames
Surnames from given names